The qualification for the 2013 Boys' Youth European Volleyball Championship was held from January 8–11, 2015. 31 teams are split into eight groups of 3 or 4 teams. The group winners and second placed teams were qualified for the 2015 Boys' Youth European Volleyball Championship in Bosnia and Herzegovina and Serbia.

Competing nations

Pool A
The mini-tournament was hosted in Brno, Czech Republic.

Pool B
The mini-tournament was hosted in Jelgava, Latvia.

Pool C
The mini-tournament was hosted in Nitra, Slovakia.

Pool D
The mini-tournament was hosted in Ankara, Turkey.

Pool E
The mini-tournament was hosted in Kecskemét, Hungary.

External links
Official site

European Boys' Youth Championship Qualification
Boys' Youth European Volleyball Championship